Liberalism in China is a development from classical liberalism as it was introduced into China during the Republican period and, later, reintroduced after the end of the Cultural Revolution.

History

Republic of China 
During the Republican period, translations of John Stuart Mill, Herbert Spencer, Immanuel Kant, Jean-Jacques Rousseau and many other works were produced in China. These writers had a cumulative effect, as did the ascendancy of liberalism in world powers like Britain, France and the United States. The establishment of the Republic of China in 1912 signaled the acceptance (at least in principle) of these models and the liberal values with which they identified, such as constitutionalism and the separation of powers.

The writings of Liang Qichao (1873–1929) played a major role, despite his leanings to a conservative outlook in latter years. The New Culture Movement (1915) and its immediate successor the May Fourth Movement (1919) initially were strongly liberal in character, with key figures like Hu Shih (1891–1962) as the preeminent exponent of liberal values. Other important liberals were Zhang Dongsun (1886–1973) and Zhang Junmai (1887–1969).

Liberalism was to suffer in the wake of the immense challenges China faced from Japanese militarism and the impact of the Communist movement. By the 1930s, many of the younger generation felt that only radical, authoritarian doctrines could save the country. Liberalism increasingly seemed to serve as a forlorn "third force", able only to admonish authoritarian regimes of the Left and Right. Writers such as Chu Anping, however, made a strong case against the Kuomintang; educators and scholars such as Fei Xiaotong and Tao Xingzhi made a case for revolution as a cause worthy of liberal support; while many more liberals left China, including the rural reformer James Yen, the university president Chiang Monlin, and many less well known figures.

Later under its newly adopted 1947 Constitution of the Republic of China, the 1947 National Assembly election, 1948 Legislative Yuan election, and 1948 presidential election took place in China. With a population of 461 million then, these elections also made China the largest democracy at the time.

People's Republic of China 

The ascendancy of Mao Zedong and the establishment of the People's Republic of China in 1949 brought the liberal impulse to its lowest level. Ideological witchhunts were organized against the (real or imaginary) followers of Hu Shih, and their values were ceaselessly derided as bourgeois delusions which could only weaken the nation.

With the collapse of Mao's ideology on his death, seeds of regeneration which had lain dormant gradually came to life. Liberal ideals like intellectual freedom, the separation of powers, civil society and the rule of law were reexamined in the light of the destruction wrought by the Communist party which had been so vociferous in denigrating them. Starting in the Cultural Revolution, many younger people experienced virtual conversions to liberalism. This process was given further impetus by the Tiananmen Square protests leading up to the massacre of June 4, 1989. The democracy movement espoused (however imperfectly) many liberal doctrines. Among the key figures were Wang Ruoshui (1926–2002), who while remaining a Marxist humanist reconfigured this doctrine along liberal lines, and Liu Xiaobo (1955–2017), initially a literary critic, who broke with Marxism to combine existentialist themes with liberalism.

In the 1990s the liberal wing of the remnant of the pro-democracy movement re-emerged following the Tiananmen crackdown, including figures like Qin Hui, Li Shenzhi, Zhu Xueqin, Xu Youyu, Liu Junning and many others. The writings of Gu Zhun (1915–1974) were rediscovered, providing evidence of a stubborn core of liberal values that the communist movement had failed to extinguish. Ranged against the liberals are the Chinese New Left and populist nationalism.

Chinese liberalism itself tends to divide into market liberalism, impressed by the US as a political model and adhering to the doctrines of Hayek and other neoliberals, and left-liberalism, more aligned with European social democracy and the welfare state. These tendencies continue to evolve in an uneasy state of tension. Nonetheless, Chinese liberalism has clearly emerged in its social democratic form is even influencing the doctrinal evolution of the Chinese Communist Party.

Li Keqiang is viewed as a liberal in China's ruling elite, advocating for economic liberty. Wang Yang is viewed as a liberal in China's ruling elite, representing a school of thought that advocates for gradual political liberalization.

See also
 Hu Shih
 P. C. Chang
 Xu Zhangrun
 Qin Hui

References

 
Chinese democracy movements
Political history of China
China